Rosewell and Hawthornden railway station served the village of Rosewell, Midlothian, Scotland from 1855 to 1962 on the Peebles Railway.

History 
The station opened on 4 July 1855 by the Peebles Railway. The station was situated on the south side of the A6094. In March 1872 the NBR requested that Rosewell should be added to the beginning of the station's name. The directors of the Peebles Railway declined this, although it was later changed. Various combinations were used, such as Hawthornden & Rosewell and Hawthornden Junction & Rosewell, but Rosewell and Hawthornden was eventually used from 9 July 1928. The goods yard was to the west of the down platform and had one siding which ran to a cattle dock. The station was closed to both passengers and goods traffic on 10 September 1962.

References

External links 

Disused railway stations in Midlothian
Former North British Railway stations
Railway stations in Great Britain opened in 1855
Railway stations in Great Britain closed in 1962
1855 establishments in Scotland
1962 disestablishments in Scotland